Frederick Pickering  (19 January 1941 – 9 February 2019) was an English professional footballer. He played as a forward.

Career

Domestic career
Pickering began his career with his hometown club, Blackburn Rovers, in 1959, signing professional forms on his 17th birthday.

International career
Pickering won three caps and scored five goals for England in 1964 during his Everton career. He made his international debut on 27 May 1964, against the United States, and scored a hat-trick in a 10–0 victory for Alf Ramsey's team.

References
Specific

General

England profile at EnglandStats.com

External links
Singing the Blues - Fred Pickering

1941 births
2019 deaths
Footballers from Blackburn
English footballers
England international footballers
England under-23 international footballers
Blackburn Rovers F.C. players
Everton F.C. players
Birmingham City F.C. players
Blackpool F.C. players
Brighton & Hove Albion F.C. players
English Football League players
English Football League representative players
Association football forwards